Crikey! It's the Irwins is an Australian reality television series starring Robert, Bindi and Terri Irwin. The series follows the family of Steve Irwin, and their work at the Australia Zoo. It premiered on 28 October 2018, on Animal Planet.

On 28 May 2020, it was announced that the show was renewed for a third season, set to premiere later in the year, and that the show would be airing a special episode entitled "Life in Lockdown" showcasing how the COVID-19 pandemic in Australia had affected operations at Australia Zoo on 11 July. The third season premiered on 7 February 2021 on discovery+ with the premiere episode also airing on Animal Planet after the Puppy Bowl. The third season's linear airing on Animal Planet began on June 5, 2021. The fourth season premiered on 1 January 2022.

Premise
Crikey! It's the Irwins follows the family of the late Australian conservationist and zookeeper Steve Irwin (aka "The Crocodile Hunter") as they live and work at the Australia Zoo. Cameras capture the family caring for all the zoo's animals as well as their home life.

Cast
Terri Irwin – Robert and Bindi Irwin's mother and Grace's grandmother and Australia Zoo's owner
Bindi Irwin – Steve and Terri Irwin's daughter and Robert Irwin's older sister
Robert Irwin – Steve and Terri Irwin's son and Bindi Irwin's younger brother
Wes Mannion – Steve's best friend and Australia Zoo's director (seasons 1–3 only)
Chandler Powell – Bindi's husband and Grace Warrior's father who also works at Australia Zoo
Steve Irwin – The late crocodile hunter and Robert and Bindi's father and Terri's husband (appears in archive footage)
Grace Warrior Irwin Powell – Chandler Powell and Bindi Irwin's daughter and Robert Irwin's niece
 Dr. Rosemary Booth – Australia Zoo Wildlife Hospital Chief of Staff
 Dr. Sam Young – Head Zoo Veterinarian
Luke Reavley – General Manager of Australia Zoo and former Irwin family assistant

Episodes

Season 1 (2018–19)

Season 2 (2019)

Season 3 (2021)

Season 4 (2022)

Specials (2019–21)

See also

List of Animal Planet original programming

Notes

References

External links

2010s American reality television series
2020s American reality television series
2018 American television series debuts
2018 Australian television series debuts
2022 American television series endings
2022 Australian television series endings
Animal Planet original programming
2010s Australian reality television series
2020s Australian reality television series
Nature educational television series
Television series about families
Television shows filmed in Australia
Television shows filmed in South Africa
Television shows filmed in Oregon
Television shows filmed in Arizona
Television shows set in Queensland
Television series by Eureka
Television series impacted by the COVID-19 pandemic
Steve Irwin